Henry Hase (September 26, 1847 – January 25, 1929) was an American politician.

Hase served as acting mayor of Milwaukee, Wisconsin from June 5, 1893 until July 1, 1893, when Peter J. Somers resigned in order to serve in the United States House of Representatives. Born in Port Washington, Wisconsin, Hase worked for Pabst Brewing Company. During the American Civil War, he served in the Union army. Hase served on the Milwaukee Common Council and was President of the Common Council.

Notes

People from Port Washington, Wisconsin
People of Wisconsin in the American Civil War
Milwaukee Common Council members
Mayors of Milwaukee
1847 births
1929 deaths